Francis Patrick Mulcahy CBE (March 9, 1894 – December 11, 1973) was a general and commander in the United States Marine Corps during World War II.  Mulcahy commanded the 2nd Marine Aircraft Wing, the Cactus Air Force, and the Tactical Air Force, Tenth Army.

Military career
Mulcahy, a native of Rochester, New York, graduated from Notre Dame University in 1914. In 1917, he was commissioned and attended naval flight school, becoming a naval aviator. Like Roy S. Geiger, Mulcahy flew bombing missions in France during World War I. He became one of the Marine Corps pioneers of close air support to ground operations during the inter-war years of expeditionary campaigns in the Caribbean and Central America.

At the time of the Japanese attack on Pearl Harbor, Mulcahy was serving as an observer with the British Western Desert Air Force in North Africa. He deployed to the Pacific in command of the 2nd Marine Aircraft Wing. In the closing months of the Guadalcanal campaign, Mulcahy served in command of Allied Air Forces in the Solomon Islands, also known as the Cactus Air Force.

In August 1943, Mulcahy moved from Guadalcanal to New Georgia to command air units operating out of the newly captured airfield at Munda Point.

In September 1944, Mulcahy succeeded Major General Ross E. Rowell, USMC, as the commanding general of Aircraft, Fleet Marine Force. He was also commanding general of the Marine Fleet Air, West Coast.

Mulcahy volunteered to lead the Tactical Air Force, Tenth Army during the Invasion of Okinawa. He was deployed ashore early to the freshly captured air fields at Yontan and Kadena, and worked to coordinate the combat deployment of his joint-service aviators against the kamikaze threat to the fleet and in support of the Tenth Army in its protracted inland campaign.  On June 11, 1945, he was relieved by Louis E. Woods because of poor health. Upon his retirement he was promoted to the rank of lieutenant general.

He died on December 11, 1973.

Awards
Mulcahy was the recipient of the following awards:

See also

List of Historically Important U.S. Marines

Notes

References

Web

Print

External links

 Arlington National Cemetery

1894 births
1973 deaths
Military personnel from Rochester, New York
United States Marine Corps generals
United States Naval Aviators
University of Notre Dame alumni
Air Corps Tactical School alumni
United States Army Command and General Staff College alumni
Naval War College alumni
United States Marine Corps personnel of World War I
United States Marine Corps World War II generals
Recipients of the Navy Distinguished Service Medal
Recipients of the Distinguished Service Medal (US Army)
Recipients of the Legion of Merit
Commanders of the Order of the British Empire
Military personnel from New York (state)